Brasilotitan (meaning "Brazil giant") is a genus of titanosaurian sauropod dinosaur from the Late Cretaceous (early Maastrichtian) Adamantina Formation of Brazil. The type species is Brasilotitan nemophagus.

Material and morphology
The holotype was collected near Presidente Prudente city, São Paulo state. It consists of a dentary, cervical and sacral vertebrae, one ungual, and remains of the pelvic region. The mandible has an 'L' shaped  morphology, with the symphyseal region of the dentary slightly twisted medially, a feature never recorded before in any titanosaur.

Phylogeny
Although the phylogenetic position of Brasilotitan is difficult to establish, the new species is neither basal nor a derived member of Titanosauria. Based on lower jaw morphology, it appears to be closely related to Antarctosaurus and Bonitasaura. This discovery enriches the titanosaur diversity of Brazil and provides further new anatomical information on the lower jaws of those herbivorous dinosaurs.

References

Titanosaurs
Late Cretaceous dinosaurs of South America
Cretaceous Brazil
Fossils of Brazil
Adamantina Formation
Fossil taxa described in 2013